Marinifilum albidiflavum is a Gram-negative and facultatively anaerobic bacterium from the genus of Marinifilum which has been isolated from sediments from the coast of Weihai in China.

References

External links
Type strain of Marinifilum albidiflavum at BacDive -  the Bacterial Diversity Metadatabase

Bacteria described in 2016
Bacteroidia